Botucatu Futebol Clube, usually known simply as Botucatu, was a Brazilian women's football team, from Botucatu, São Paulo state.

History
On February 16, 1996, Botucatu Futebol Clube was founded by Edson Castro after an invitation of the Federação Paulista de Futebol Feminino (São Paulo State's Women's Football Federation), which was the organizer of the Campeonato Paulista Feminino do Interior (Countryside Paulista State Championship).

In 2006, the club won the Brazil Trophy beating CEPE-Caxias in the final. The competition's top goalscorer was Grazielle, of Botucatu, who scored 11 goals. In the same year, the club also won the Paulista Women's Football Championship, beating Saad in the final. In 2008, Botucatu won the state championship for the second time, after beating again Saad in the final.

Achievements
 Taça Brasil:
 Winners (1): 2006
 Paulista Feminino:
 Winners (3): 2006, 2008, 2009

Current squad (some players)
According to the CBF official website.

Former players
For details of all current and former players with a Wikipedia article, see :Category:Botucatu Futebol Clube players.

Other sports
Besides football, the club also has a women's futsal section.

References

External links
 Official website

Association football clubs established in 1996
Association football clubs disestablished in 2010
Defunct football clubs in São Paulo (state)
Defunct women's football clubs in Brazil
1996 establishments in Brazil
2010 disestablishments in Brazil